Węgierki Palace - historic palace in Węgierki (Września County, Poland). Since 1974 national heritage site (Polish: zabytek).

The palace was built in the second half of the 19th century (around 1890) and has elements of neoclassical architecture. This building housed a library and a school. Today the building is divided into apartments. During 2011 and 2012 a renovation of the palace's facade was carried out.

There was a natural park, with an area of about 3.06 ha, established in the 19th century.

Gallery

Sources 
 Franciszek Jaśkowiak, Województwo poznańskie - przewodnik, Warszawa 1967

References 

Gmina Września
Palaces in Poland
Objects of cultural heritage in Poland